Sviatlana Heorhiyeuna Tsikhanouskaya ( Pilipchuk; born 11 September 1982) is a Belarusian political activist. She stood for election in the 2020 Belarusian presidential election as the main opposition candidate after her husband, Sergei Tikhanovsky, the previous candidate, was arrested in Hrodna by Belarusian authorities. Since August 2020, she has conducted her opposition activity in exile from Poland then Lithuania. Tsikhanouskaya is wanted by the state of Belarus for conspiracy to seize state power, the creation of an extremist formation, and public calls for the seizure of power, and in March 2023 was sentenced in-absentia to a 15-year jail term.

Early life, education and personal life
She was born on September 11, 1982 in the village of Mikashevichy, Brest Region to Georgy Ivanovich and Valentina Nikolaevna Pilipchuk. Her father worked as a driver and her mother as a cook. Her great-grandfather Afanasiy Krivulets served in the Red Army during World War II and was killed on 2 May 1945 near Berlin during the Battle of Berlin.

She spent many summers since she was 12 in Roscrea, Co. Tipperary, Ireland, as part of a programme for children affected by the Chernobyl disaster. 

Until 2020 Tsikhanouskaya was an English teacher and interpreter. She is married to YouTuber, blogger, and pro-democracy activist Sergei Tikhanovsky, who was arrested in May 2020. The couple have a son and a daughter.

Political career

2020 Belarusian presidential election campaign 

After her husband's arrest on 29 May, Tsikhanouskaya announced her intention to run in his place. She registered as an Independent candidate on 14 July 2020. After registering, she was endorsed by the campaigns of Valery Tsepkalo and Viktar Babaryka, two prominent opposition politicians who were barred from registering, with one being arrested and the other fleeing the country. During the presidential campaign a photo of Tsikhanouskaya with Maria Kolesnikova (Babaryka's campaign chief), and Veronika Tsepkalo (Valery Tsepkalo's wife), became a symbol of her campaign.

The night before the election, police detained senior staffers from Tsikhanouskaya's campaign and she chose to go into hiding in Minsk, before re-emerging on election day at a polling station.

Harassment 
Before the presidential campaign, Belarusian president Alexander Lukashenko insisted that the country was not ready for a female president. Her campaign began as Amnesty International condemned Belarus's discriminatory treatment of women opposition activists, including threats of sexual violence and threats by authorities to take children away from opposition figures and send them to state-run orphanages. In response to the threats, Tsikhanouskaya sent her children abroad to live with their grandmother. During the presidential campaign, Tsikhanouskaya was repeatedly threatened, recounting phone calls from unknown numbers, addressing to her: "We will put you behind bars and place your children in an orphanage." Tsikhanouskaya said she then decided to persevere in her campaign: "There must be a symbol of freedom."

Platform 
Tsikhanouskaya said that she ran for president out of love, to free her husband from prison. She vowed to free all political prisoners in Belarus, to introduce democratic reforms to the country, and to move away from the union treaty with Russia. She also pledged to set a referendum on returning to the original draft of the 1994 Belarusian constitution, reinstating a limit of two terms for the president. She said that her main goal is to establish free and fair elections. She said she viewed the election as illegitimate due to the government's refusal to register Lukashenko's main political opponents as candidates. She pledged to deliver a plan for transparent and accountable elections within six months of taking office.

Tsikhanouskaya's economic platform emphasized increasing the importance of small and medium-sized businesses in the Belarusian economy. She planned to offer interest free loans to small and medium-sized businesses, cancel state inspections of private entities and provide legal protection for foreign investors. She planned to allow profitable state owned enterprises to continue to operate, while requiring unprofitable state owned enterprises to take advice from outside professionals.

Supporters 

Though running as an independent candidate, Tsikhanouskaya attracted support from across the spectrum of Belarus's political opposition. Vital Rymašeŭski, co-leader of Belarusian Christian Democracy, announced his party's support, as did the Belarusian Social Democratic Party (Assembly), United Civic Party of Belarus and Belarusian Women's Party "Nadzieja". She also received support from 2010 presidential candidate Mikola Statkevich. Ivonka Survilla, president of the Rada of the Belarusian People's Republic expressed her support for Tsikhanouskaya.

Rallies in support of Tsikhanouskaya and in opposition to Lukashenko were the largest in the history of post-Soviet Belarus, attracting crowds of 20,000 in Brest and 60,000 in Minsk.

Official results 
The official results published by the Central Election Commission of Belarus gave Tsikhanouskaya 588,622 votes, or 10.12% of the vote, to Lukashenko's 80.10%. However, allegations of widespread fraud were immediately made public, including a formal complaint to the Central Election Commission (CEC) by Tsikhanouskaya.

Post 2020 Belarusian presidential election

Exile 

After Belarusian state television released an exit poll showed Lukashenko winning by an overwhelming margin, Tsikhanouskaya said that she didn't trust that poll, saying, "I believe my eyes, and I see that the majority is with us." She filed a formal complaint with the Central Election Commission on election night, but was detained for seven hours in retaliation. After her release from detention, Tsikhanouskaya chose to flee to Lithuania in fear of repercussions, which could have possibly affected her children. She was escorted to the Lithuanian border by Belarusian security forces, reportedly a condition of a deal securing the release of her campaign manager, Maria Moroz.

On 11 August 2020 Lithuanian foreign minister Linas Linkevičius announced that Tsikhanouskaya was "safe" in Lithuania while also acknowledging that she had "few options". Also on 11 August, the State Security Committee of Belarus announced that an attempt was being made on Tsikhanouskaya's life, saying that the protesters needed a "sacred sacrifice". Later that night, state television released a video message from Tsikhanouskaya in which she seemingly conceded defeat and urged the end of protests. However, the stark change in demeanor and message led allies to claim that the video had been coerced, with some going as far as to liken it to a hostage video.

The Polish government allotted a residence for Tsikhanouskaya and other members of the Belarusian opposition in the Praga-Południe district of Warsaw. She opened the residence along with the Belarusian House in Warsaw, where in due course she met with Polish Prime Minister Mateusz Morawiecki. Her fellow opposition activist Valery Tsepkalo has also moved to Poland from Ukraine. On 20 July 2021, Tsikhanouskaya said that she had asked officials of the US Biden administration to impose further sanctions on Belarusian companies of potash, oil, wood and steel sectors, during a visit to Washington, D.C.

Government in exile 

On 14 August 2020 Tsikhanouskaya released a video in which she claimed to have defeated Lukashenko in the first round by a decisive margin, with as little as 60% of the vote and as much as 70%. She appealed to the international community to recognise her as the winner. Tsikhanouskaya also announced the establishment of a Coordination Council to handle the transfer of power from Lukashenko. Applications for membership in the council were open only to Belarusian authority figures, such as respected professionals, authors or sportspeople.

On 17 August 2020 Tsikhanouskaya released a video where she stated that she was ready to head a transitional government and organise a new, free and fair presidential election.

On 20 August 2020 Lithuanian prime minister Saulius Skvernelis invited Tsikhanouskaya to his office and publicly referred to her as "the national leader of Belarus". On 31 August, Svetlana Tikhanovskaya was invited to address the United Nations Security Council.

On 8 September 2020 Tsikhanouskaya addressed the Parliamentary Assembly of the Council of Europe. She called for sanctions against Lukashenko, and "stated that Lukashenko doesn't have any legitimacy after stealing the vote, warning other countries against making any deals with the Belarussian government", and said that "He does not represent Belarus any more."

On 9 September 2020 Tsikhanouskaya said that the Belarusian opposition wants to have good relations with all nations, including Russia: "We cannot turn away from Russia because it will always be our neighbor, and we need to have good relations with them."

On 10 September 2020 a law was passed by the Lithuanian Parliament which recognises Tsikhanouskaya as the "elected leader of the people of Belarus" and the Coordination Council as the "only legitimate representatives of the Belarusian people". The resolution also declares that Lukashenko is an "illegitimate leader".

On 17 September 2020, the European Parliament recognised the coordination council as the "interim representation of the people demanding democratic change" in Belarus. On the same day, she released a black list of OMON officers, dubbed "Taraikovsky's List" after Alexander Taraikovsky who was killed by the OMON.

Sviatlana Tsikhanouskaya was the first speaker at the Helmut Schmidt Lecture of the Bundeskanzler-Helmut-Schmidt-Stiftung on 10 November 2021, which took place under the title "Living Democracy!" and in cooperation with the Global Public Policy Institute (GPPi) in Berlin.

2022 Russian invasion of Ukraine

On 26 February 2022, in response to Belarus' participation in the 2022 Russian invasion of Ukraine, Tsikhanouskaya posted a tweet stating "…I declared myself as the national leader of Belarus to protect the sovereignty & independence of our country, represent it in security negotiations & crisis management in the region", and mentioned that she "will create a transitional cabinet", after claiming that "Belarus has lost its independence" and alleged President Lukashenko "committed high treason" in the video in the tweet.

On 2 March 2022 Tsihanouskaya announced an anti-war mobilisation and posted a manifesto of the anti-war movement calling Belarusians to oppose Russian invasion in Ukraine and imploring Belarusian soldiers to refuse to participate in the war.

On 11 March 2022 Tsikhanouskaya endorsed the creation of the Belarusian volunteer battalion fighting in Ukraine Kastuś Kalinoŭski Battalion, she noted that "more and more people from Belarus join to help Ukrainians defend their country".

On 9 August 2022 at a conference held in Vilnius, Tsikhanouskaya announced the creation of the United Transitional Cabinet. It initially consisted of Pavel Latushko (responsible for the transition of power), Aliaksandr Azarau, (responsible for the restoration of law and order), Valery Kavaleuski, (foreign affairs), and Valery Sakhashchyk (defense and national security).

In December, 2022, Tsikhanouskaya called on Belarusians to inform Ukraine of Russian troop and equipment movements inside Belarus.

Tsikhanouskaya is wanted by the state of Belarus for conspiracy to seize state power, the creation of an extremist formation, and public calls for the seizure of power, and in March 2023 was sentenced in-absentia to a 15-year jail term.

Criticisms
Tsikhanouskaya has been accused of indecision and lack of a clear plan of action.

It has been claimed that several hundred politicians, social activists, bloggers, and journalists were forced to sign an agreement with "Tsikhanouskaya's Office", that prohibits the criticism of Tsikhanouskaya and her new associates for a period of 10 years. The violators have to pay a 30,000 euro fine.

Veronika Tsepkalo accused Tsikhanouskaya of eliminating the joint headquarters. She believes that although in 2020 the "women's trio" with Tsikhanouskaya and Kolesnikova acted together and on equal footing, but later on instead of the joint headquarters, Tsikhanouskaya's office was left. The 2020 election team was changed, new people came, and those who were in the old team "fell by the wayside".

Awards

Tsikhanouskaya was on the list of the BBC's 100 Women announced on 23 November 2020. and was included in the 2020 edition of The Bloomberg 50.

Tsikhanouskaya and other Belarus leaders of the country's democratic opposition were awarded the European Parliament's 2020 Sakharov Prize for Freedom of Thought in a ceremony on December 16 in Brussels. 
In 2021, she was nominated for the 2021 Nobel Peace Prize by President of Lithuania Gitanas Nausėda and multiple Norwegian members of parliament.
She and other Belarus leaders of the country's democratic opposition won the 2022 Charlemagne Prize.

Notes

References

External links 

 
 Twitter page of Sviatlana Tsikhanouskaya
 

1982 births
20th-century Belarusian women
21st-century Belarusian women
21st-century Belarusian women politicians
21st-century Belarusian politicians
Belarusian democracy activists
Belarusian educators
Belarusian human rights activists
Women human rights activists
Belarusian schoolteachers
Belarusian women activists
Exiled politicians
Candidates for President of Belarus
Democracy activists
Independent politicians
Interpreters
Living people
People from Luninets District
BBC 100 Women
Sakharov Prize laureates
21st-century translators
Fugitives
Fugitives wanted by Russia
People convicted in absentia